Phrae Pwo, or Northeastern Pwo, is a Karen language spoken in Phrae, Lampang, and Chiang Rai provinces of Thailand. It is not intelligible with other varieties of Pwo, though it is close to Northern Pwo.

References

Further reading
 Dawkins, Erin and Audra Phillips A Sociolinguistic Survey of Pwo Karen in Northern Thailand (see pages 44–54).

Karenic languages